John William Muller (born 7 July 1966) is an American television journalist. From 2011 until 2014, he has been with ABC News, where his anchor duties include World News Now and ABC News Now. He is the weeknight anchor of NYC's Emmy Award-winning PIX11 News. He worked as a reporter and anchor in Georgia and Florida before returning to New York City. On July 20, 2020, he returned to PIX11 as anchor of the 4:30-7am hours of the PIX11 Morning News with Vanessa Freeman.

Early life

Muller was born in Queens, New York and raised on Long Island, the middle child of seven siblings. He attended Catholic schools. His first on-camera work came as a child model for the Ford Modeling Agency, something he credits as "demystifying" the idea of working in front of cameras for a living. He received a scholarship to New York University where he majored in journalism and mass communication and minored in history. His first exposure to professional journalism came through internships with WNCY-TV, ABC News, CBS News and WNBC-TV.

Career

Georgia and Florida
Muller's first break in television came when he took a job at WTOC-TV, the CBS affiliate in Savannah, Georgia. Shooting and editing his own stories in most cases, Muller got an immediate and intense education on military coverage as he reported on troop mobilizations from Fort Stewart and Hunter Army Airfield during the raids in Panama and the Persian Gulf War. After two years he accepted a reporter position at WBBH-TV, the NBC affiliate in Fort Myers, Florida, where he won the Associated Press's prestigious "Best Individual Achievement Award" for all-round excellence in the state of Florida. Among his most noteworthy work was the dramatic coverage of hurricanes including the devastating Hurricane Andrew. He was promoted to the weekend anchor desk, his first permanent anchor position.

After three years in Fort Myers, Muller cracked the "Top 20" market plateau, catching the eye of WFLA-TV, the NBC affiliate in Tampa, Florida. Muller spent three years at WFLA as the lead reporter on the 11 p.m. news, the highest-rated local news show in the state. In Tampa, he won the Associated Press award for "Best Spot News Reporting".

New York City
His big break and return to his hometown in the number-one New York City market came when he got a call from WNBC-TV. Here Muller reported for the number-one-rated Today in New York show. He also filled-in on the weekend anchor desk and anchored WNBC's initial coverage of the death of Princess Diana.

His biggest impact on New York television came when he was chosen to anchor and host a brand-new entry in the local morning news race. The WB11 Morning News debuted in June 2000. From the outset the show made people take notice. With its no-holds-barred, fast-paced and innovative mix of hard news and fun, Muller found himself wearing many different hats and ultimately accepting an Emmy Award for Best Morning News Show. He also served as sports anchor for the broadcast as well as the anchor/reporter/producer of daily business news segments branded "It's Your Money". Muller went national landing at ABC News in 2011. He was an anchor and correspondent, based at ABC's world headquarters in New York City. He was seen across all ABC platforms as an anchor and correspondent covering stories of national and international interest. In 2014, Muller returned to WPIX to anchor weeknights at 5 and 10 p.m., alongside Tamsen Fadal.

Personal life
He resides in Tinton Falls, New Jersey. He and his longtime partner and fellow journalist Ernabel Demillo have a daughter.

See also

 List of Fordham University people 
 List of New York University alumni
 List of New York University faculty and staff
 List of people from New York City
 List of people from Savannah, Georgia
 List of people from Tampa, Florida
 List of television reporters

References

External links
 

1966 births
ABC News personalities
American child models
Male models from New York (state)
Fordham University faculty
Journalists from New York (state)
Living people
Television anchors from New York City
New York (state) television reporters
New York University alumni
People from Long Island
People from Queens, New York
People from Tinton Falls, New Jersey
Male models from New Jersey